Harlan "Biff" Wysong (April 13, 1905 – August 7, 1951) was a professional baseball pitcher. He played all or part of three seasons in Major League Baseball for the Cincinnati Reds. He appeared in 20 games from 1930 to 1932.

External links

Major League Baseball pitchers
Cincinnati Reds players
Canton Terriers players
Erie Sailors players
Columbus Senators players
Houston Buffaloes players
Columbus Red Birds players
Rochester Red Wings players
Baseball players from Ohio
People from Clinton County, Ohio
1905 births
1951 deaths